The 1957 Pepperdine Waves football team represented George Pepperdine College as an independent during the 1957 NCAA College Division football season. The team was led by third-year head coach John Scolinos and played home games at El Camino Stadium on the campus of El Camino College in Torrance, California. They finished the season with a record of three 3–6.

Schedule

Notes

References

Pepperdine
Pepperdine Waves football seasons
Pepperdine Waves football